Riga Cathedral formally The Cathedral Church of Saint Mary, is the Evangelical Lutheran cathedral in Riga, Latvia. It is the seat of the Archbishop of Riga.

The cathedral is one of the most recognizable landmarks in Latvia, and is featured in or the subject of paintings, photographs and television travelogues. Like all of the oldest churches of the city, it is known for its weathercock.

The church is commonly called the Dome Cathedral, a tautology as the word 'Dome' comes from the German Dom meaning 'cathedral'.

History and architecture
The church was built near the River Daugava in 1211 by Livonian Bishop Albert of Riga, who came from Lower Saxony in northwestern Germany. It is considered the largest medieval church in the Baltic states. It has undergone many modifications in the course of its history.

David Caspari was rector of the cathedral school in the late 17th century. His son Georg Caspari also served at the cathedral.

Following a 1923 referendum the Lutheran Church had been forced to share the cathedral with the Roman Catholic Church, but this was reversed in the 1931 Latvian Riga Cathedral referendum, returning it to the Lutheran Church.

Religious services were prohibited during the Soviet occupation from 1939 to 1989, and the cathedral was used as a concert hall. The Museum of the History of Riga and Navigation was located in the southern wing of the cathedral. The cathedral was reopened for religious services in 1991, and is used by the Evangelical Lutheran Church of Latvia.

In 2011 the copper roofing above the nave was replaced. In 2015 the tower exterior was also re-plated and its wooden support structure renewed.

Pipe organ 

The organ of the Riga Cathedral was built by E.F. Walcker & Sons of Ludwigsburg, Baden-Württemberg, Germany, in 1882–83, and was inaugurated on 31 January 1884. It has four manuals and one pedalboard. It plays 116 voices, 124 stops, 144 ranks, and 6718 pipes. It includes 18 combinations and General Crescendo. A tape of Latvian composer Lūcija Garūta playing the organ for a cantata during World War II captured the sound of battle nearby.

Boys choir 
The Riga Dom Cathedral Boys Choir has performed internationally, recording the Riga Mass by Uģis Prauliņš and other works.

Gallery

See also
List of cathedrals in Latvia

References

External links

  Riga Cathedral official website
 Riga Cathedral official website in English
  Photographs of the Riga Cathedral

Churches completed in 1211
Churches in Riga
Cathedrals in Latvia
Brick Gothic
Gothic architecture in Latvia
Lutheran churches in Latvia
Pre-Reformation Roman Catholic cathedrals
13th-century churches in Latvia